Cominella alertae is a species of predatory deepwater sea snail, a marine gastropod mollusc in the family Cominellidae.

References

 Powell A W B, New Zealand Mollusca, William Collins Publishers Ltd, Auckland, New Zealand 1979 

Cominellidae
Gastropods of New Zealand
Gastropods described in 1956